Persicaria hydropiperoides is a New World species of flowering plant in the buckwheat family known by the common names swamp smartweed and false waterpepper. It is widespread across much of North America and South America. It grows in moist and wet habitats, and is sometimes semi-aquatic.

Persicaria hydropiperoides is quite variable and is sometimes divided into several varieties, some of which may be better treated as species in their own right.

In general, Persicaria hydropiperoides is a rhizomatous perennial herb growing upright or erect and approaching a maximum height of one meter (40 inches). Roots may emerge from nodes on the lower stem. The bristly lance-shaped leaves are around 10 centimeters (4 inches) long. The leaves have sheathing stipules known as ochrea. The spikelike inflorescence produces many pinkish flowers each about 3 millimeters wide.

References

External links
Jepson Manual Treatment
Missouri Plants Photo Profile
Calphotos Photo gallery, University of California
photo of herbarium specimen at Missouri Botanical Garden, collected in Peru in 2012

hydropiperoides
Flora of North America
Flora of South America
Plants described in 1803
Natural history of the California chaparral and woodlands